Ashwell & Morden railway station is a wayside railway station in Cambridgeshire, England. Close to the border with the county of Hertfordshire, it is in the hamlet of Odsey, slightly north of the Icknield Way, a Roman Road that is now the A505. Train services are currently operated by Thameslink.

The villages it serves, as well as Odsey, are Ashwell, Guilden Morden and Steeple Morden, although it is located a couple of miles from each of them and linked to them only by minor roads.

History

Opened as Ashwell station by the Royston and Hitchin Railway (R&HR) on 21 October 1850, the R&HR was later absorbed by the Great Northern Railway (GNR). The name was changed to Ashwell and Morden on 1 April 1920 three years before the GNR amalgamated with several other railways to form the London and North Eastern Railway during the Grouping of 1923. The station then passed on to the Eastern Region of British Railways on nationalisation in 1948.

When Sectorisation was introduced in the 1980s, the station was served by Network SouthEast until the Privatisation of British Railways.

Services 
All services at Ashwell & Morden are operated by Thameslink using  EMUs.

The typical off-peak service in trains per hour is:

On weekends, one of the hourly services between London and Cambridge terminates at Royston.

References

External links 

Railway stations in Cambridgeshire
DfT Category E stations
Former Great Northern Railway stations
Railway stations in Great Britain opened in 1850
Railway stations served by Govia Thameslink Railway